Spirobolida is an order of "round-backed" millipedes containing approximately 500 species in 12 families. Its members are distinguished by the presence of a "pronounced suture that runs "vertically down the front of the head". Most of the species live in the tropics, and many are brightly coloured. Mature males have two pairs of modified legs, the gonopods, consisting of the 8th and 9th leg pair: the posterior gonopods are used in sperm-transfer while the anterior gonopods are fused into a single plate-like structure.

The families are divided into two suborders:

Suborder Spirobolidea
Allopocockiidae
Atopetholidae
Floridobolidae
Hoffmanobolidae
Messicobolidae
Pseudospirobolellidae
Rhinocricidae
Spirobolellidae
Spirobolidae
Typhlobolellidae
Suborder Trigoniulidea
Pachybolidae
Trigoniulidae

Select species 
Narceus americanus, a commonly seen species in eastern North America
Crurifarcimen vagans, the "Wandering Leg Sausage"
Anadenobolus monilicornis, the Yellow-banded Millipede
Eucarlia, a genus of threatened Indo-Pacific millipedes

References

External links

 
Millipede orders
Taxa named by Charles Harvey Bollman